Bojan Globočnik (26 February 1962 – August 2021) was a Slovenian ski jumper. He competed in the normal hill event at the 1984 Winter Olympics.

References

External links
 

1962 births
2021 deaths
Slovenian male ski jumpers
Olympic ski jumpers of Yugoslavia
Ski jumpers at the 1984 Winter Olympics
Sportspeople from Kranj